Locust Township is one of seventeen townships in Christian County, Illinois, USA.  As of the 2020 census, its population was 3,137 and it contained 249 housing units.

Geography

Cities, towns, villages
 Owaneco
 Taylorville (east edge)

Unincorporated towns
 Millersville at 
 Velma at

Cemeteries
The township contains these cemeteries: Buckeye, Donner, Durbin, Millersville, Owaneco and County Poor Farm.

Major highways
  Illinois Route 29

Airports and landing strips
 Metsker Landing Strip

Demographics
As of the 2020 census there were 3,137 people, 229 households, and 161 families residing in the township. The racial makeup of the township was 71.53% White, 7.01% African American, 0.03% Native American, 0.57% Asian, 0.00% Pacific Islander, 20.43% from other races, and 0.41% from two or more races. Hispanic or Latino of any race were 22.41% of the population.

There were 229 households, out of which 36.20% had children under the age of 18 living with them, 65.07% were married couples living together, 3.93% had a female householder with no spouse present, and 29.69% were non-families. 22.30% of all households were made up of individuals, and 6.10% had someone living alone who was 65 years of age or older. The average household size was 2.56 and the average family size was 3.01.

The township's age distribution consisted of 5.9% under the age of 18, 6.0% from 18 to 24, 40.7% from 25 to 44, 39.5% from 45 to 64, and 7.9% who were 65 years of age or older. The median age was 44.1 years. For every 100 females, there were 564.3 males. For every 100 females age 18 and over, there were 695.5 males.

The median income for a household in the township was $69,886, and the median income for a family was $86,042. Males had a median income of $41,638 versus $24,514 for females. The per capita income for the township was $13,064. No families and 8.2% of the population were below the poverty line, including none of those under age 18 and 1.6% of those age 65 or over.

School districts
 Central A & M Community Unit School District 21
 Pana Community Unit School District 8
 Taylorville Community Unit School District 3

Political districts
 State House District 98
 State Senate District 49

References
 
 United States Census Bureau 2009 TIGER/Line Shapefiles
 United States National Atlas

External links
 City-Data.com
 Illinois State Archives
 Township Officials of Illinois

Townships in Christian County, Illinois
Townships in Illinois